Milene Figueiredo (born 3 February 1983) is a Brazilian handball player.

She was born in Guarulhos, Brazil. She competed at the 2004 Summer Olympics, where Brazil placed 7th.

References

1983 births
Living people
People from Guarulhos
Brazilian female handball players
Olympic handball players of Brazil
Handball players at the 2004 Summer Olympics
Sportspeople from São Paulo (state)
Pan American Games medalists in handball
Medalists at the 2007 Pan American Games
Pan American Games gold medalists for Brazil
Handball players at the 2007 Pan American Games
20th-century Brazilian women
21st-century Brazilian women